The Hampton River is a  tidal river in Glynn County, Georgia.  It forms a channel between Saint Simons Island and Little Saint Simons Island on the Atlantic coast.

See also
List of rivers of Georgia

References 

Rivers of Georgia (U.S. state)
Rivers of Glynn County, Georgia